The J. B. Allen House is a historic residence in Petoskey, Michigan, United States, that is listed on the National Register of Historic Places.

Description
The private house is located at 822 Grove Street. It has a two-story hipped roof frame structure on a stone foundation. Its hipped roof entrance porch is supported by Doric piers. On the front, a single-story hip roofed bay projects forward. To the side, a single-story hipped roof addition extends from the main block of the house. The windows are one-over-one units.

The house was constructed c. 1898, and is associated with J.B. Allen, a teacher, who lived here by 1899. It was placed on the National Register of Historic Places September 10, 1986.

See also

 National Register of Historic Places listings in Emmet County, Michigan

References

External links

National Register of Historic Places in Emmet County, Michigan
Houses on the National Register of Historic Places in Michigan
Houses completed in 1898
Emmet County, Michigan
1898 establishments in Michigan